The 1983 French motorcycle Grand Prix was the second round of the 1983 Grand Prix motorcycle racing season. It took place on the weekend of 2–3 April 1983 at the Bugatti Circuit in Le Mans.

This race was remembered for two fatal accidents that occurred over the weekend in the 500cc class. The first occurred during Friday practice when Italian rider Loris Reggiani collided with Japanese rider Iwao Ishikawa. Ishikawa died shortly after from severe injuries. In the race itself, defending winner Michel Frutschi crashed heavily and was taken to hospital, but later died.

Classification

500 cc

References

French motorcycle Grand Prix
French
Motorcycle Grand Prix
French motorcycle Grand Prix